Afghanistan national under-20 football team  is controlled by Afghanistan Football Federation and represents Afghanistan in international under-20 football competitions. Afghanistan's best performance in International games was on 1977 AFC Youth Championship when they reached the Quarter Final.

2012 AFC U-19 Championship qualification

Group C 
Afghanistan withdrew from 2012 AFC U-19 Championship qualification.

AFC Youth Championship record

External links
 Afghanistan under-20 national football team
 iddaa tahminleri

under-20
Asian national under-20 association football teams
Youth football in Afghanistan